Hunter Valley Grammar School (abbreviated as HVGS) is an independent secular co-educational early learning, primary, and secondary day school, located in Ashtonfield, a suburb of Maitland, in the lower Hunter Region of New South Wales, Australia. HVGS is only 2 hours north of Sydney and 45 minutes west of Newcastle.

The School caters for approximately 1,215 students from early learning through to Year 12.

Hunter Valley Grammar School is affiliated with the Association of Heads of Independent Schools of Australia (AHISA), the Junior School Heads Association of Australia (JSHAA), the Association of Independent Schools of New South Wales (AISNSW), and Hunter Region Independent Schools (HRIS). The School is also an International Baccalaureate (IB) School offering the Primary Years Programme (PYP), Middle Years Programme (MYP) and Career-related Programme.

Curriculum
Students have the opportunity to participate in, English, Mathematics, Science, French, Japanese, German, Humanities (History and Geography), Visual Art, Music, Drama, Technology (Engineering, Textiles, Food Technology, Design Technology, IST, Hospitality, Agriculture), and PDHPE.

HSC electives include English Advanced and Extensions 1 and 2, Mathematics General and Extensions 1 and 2, Biology, Chemistry, Physics, Earth and Environmental Sciences, Modern History, Ancient History, French, German and Japanese Continuers, Drama, Economics, Legal Studies, Business Studies, Geography, Society and Culture, Visual Arts, Photography, Music 1 and 2, PDHPE, Design and Technology and IST.

Co-curriculum

Academic opportunities
Students have the opportunity to explore academic-based co-curricular activities.

The ASX Sharemarket Game, which students compete with the nation in achieving the highest market share for CA$H PRIZE, Australian Business Week and the Online Global Challenge are run by the Commerce faculty, whilst Debating, Chess, Tournament of Minds and Mock Trials are run through the English faculty.

Sport 
HVGS students may participate in a variety of sports, mainly within the HRIS competition. Sports include rugby union, rugby league, soccer, netball, cricket, tennis, basketball, rowing, equestrian, touch football, volleyball, athletics, hockey, golf, aerobics, and snowsports. Most of these sports are undertaken on the School premises. Sport facilities include an indoor multi-purpose hall (used for Basketball, Netball, Volleyball and Futsal) a rugby oval, soccer oval, cricket oval, two basketball courts, two tennis courts and cricket nets.

The School's rowing complex is located at Berry Park, Morpeth along the Hunter River. The rowing shed was upgraded to a two-story complex in 2015, allowing for more boats, training equipment, and improving the existing amenities. The School's annual regatta occurs at the beginning of November.

Performing arts
Hunter Valley Grammar School has maintained an active music program for 30 years. It runs all Higher School Certificate (HSC) relevant music courses. In 2010 construction was completed on the Music Centre, connected to the Senior Centre from above.

Students perform at the annual HRIS and HICES cultural festivals and other similar events. Co-curricular activities include: the K-6 Choir; 7-12 Choir; Senior Vocal Ensemble; Junior and Senior Concert Band; Stage Band Senior; Senior Strings; K-6 Percussion Ensemble, the 7-12 Percussion Ensemble; and many more. 

Hunter Valley Grammar School offers drama as a subject for students from Years 9 - 12.

The School presents an annual drama production; alternating between musicals and plays. Throughout the years Hunter Valley Grammar has put on a variety of productions including: Joseph and the Amazing Technicolor Dreamcoat, Oh, What a Lovely War!, The Wizard of Oz, Hamlet, Moonlight Avenue, Death by Chocolate, Blabbermouth, Friday Knight Fever, A Midsummer Night's Dream, High School Musical, Community Spirits, Peter Pan, Beauty and the Beast,  Grease, Get Smart, Nutcracker, The Little Mermaid, Cinderella panto, Kaleidoscope Reimagined and in 2022, The Addams Family.

Service opportunities 
The school participates in the Duke of Edinburgh program, and also maintains an active Leo Club which focuses on school and community programs.

Local and overseas tours 
Overseas tours and community service projects are part of our School’s comprehensive and holistic educational experiences. There are two humanitarian tours available: Zimbabwe Service Project, Vietnam Community Service Project. The School also has tours to Europe.

Notable alumni 

 Charles Croucher - Television reporter
 Kate Gill - Australian soccer player, former Matilda's Captain and Co-Chief Executive, PFA

Associated schools
Hunter Valley Grammar School is the sister school of Erasmus-Gymnasium in Grevenbroich, Germany, which visits the school yearly.

See also

List of non-government schools in New South Wales

References

Educational institutions established in 1990
Private secondary schools in New South Wales
Private primary schools in New South Wales
Maitland, New South Wales
1990 establishments in Australia
Grammar schools in Australia